The 2023 Clemson Tigers baseball team are the varsity intercollegiate baseball team that represents Clemson University during the 2023 NCAA Division I baseball season. The Tigers compete in the Atlantic Coast Conference (ACC) and are led by first-year head coach Erik Bakich.  Clemson plays its home games at Doug Kingsmore Stadium in Clemson, South Carolina.

Previous season
The Tigers finished the 2022 season 35–23 overall and 13–16 in ACC Play, to finish in sixth place in the Atlantic Division.  As the twelfth seed in the ACC Tournament they were placed in pool A with first seed Virginia Tech and eight seed North Carolina.  They lost both games and were eliminated from the tournament.  They were not invited to the NCAA Tournament for the second consecutive year.  It was the first time the Tigers had missed the NCAA Tournament in consecutive years since 1982-1986.  It was their first time missing back-to-back tournaments since the field expanded to 64 teams in 1999.  At the end of the season, Monte Lee was fired as the head coach.

Personnel

Roster

Coaching Staff

Schedule

Note: All rankings shown are from D1Baseball Poll.

Rankings

References

Clemson Tigers baseball seasons
Clemson
Clemson baseball